Alexandreni may refer to:

Alexandreni, a commune in Sîngerei district, Moldova (including a village by the same name)
Alexandreni, a village in Edineţ district, Moldova

See also 
 Alexe (name)
 Alexandrescu (surname)